Racinoa pallicornis is a moth in the Bombycidae family. It was described by Strand in 1910. It is found in South Africa.

References

Natural History Museum Lepidoptera generic names catalog

Endemic moths of South Africa
Bombycidae
Moths described in 1910